Frontline is an investigative journalism television program from PBS (Public Broadcasting Service), producing in-depth documentaries on a variety of domestic and international stories and issues, and broadcasting them on air and online. Produced at WGBH-TV in Boston, Massachusetts, and distributed through PBS in the United States, the critically acclaimed program has received every major award in broadcast journalism. Its investigations have helped breathe new life into terrorism cold cases, freed innocent people from jail, prompted U.N. resolutions, and spurred both policy and social change.

Series overview

Episodes

Season 1 (1983)
Frontlines the first season, in 1983, was the only season to have Jessica Savitch as its host (Savitch died in October of that year).

Season 2 (1984)
Season 2 of Frontline saw Judy Woodruff become the show's host after Jessica Savitch's death.

Season 3 (1985)

Season 4 (1986)
During its fourth season, Frontline presented Comrades, a 12-part documentary series that originally aired on the BBC in Great Britain.  Comrades profiled everyday life in and citizens of the Soviet Union through interviews and fly on the wall filming.  Frontlines presentation of Comrades featured "wraparound" segments where host Judy Woodruff interviewed Richard Denton and other Comrades producers about the episode's background.

Season 5 (1987)
The end of Frontlines 5th season featured the documentary Apartheid.  Spanning over 3 centuries, the 5-part historical documentary looked into the background and practice by South Africa's government of apartheid, the institutionalized form of racial segregation that favored the country's white minority at the expense of its indigenous black population.

Season 6 (1988)

Season 7 (1988–89)
Frontlines 7th season was Judy Woodruff's last as on-air host.

Season 8 (1989–1990)
Beginning with Season 8, Frontline would eschew from using a regular on-air host, using an off-screen narrator to introduce each episode.

As part of its 8th season, Frontline aired the 4-part documentary Decade of Destruction.  Produced by Adrian Cowell, the series spotlighted the destruction of Brazil's Amazon rainforest, regarded as one of Earth's "last great frontier[s]," during the decade of the 1980s.

Season 9 (1990–91)

Season 10 (1991–92)

Season 11 (1992–93)

Season 12 (1993–94)

Season 13 (1994–95)

Season 14 (1995–96)

Season 15 (1996–97)

Season 16 (1997–98)

Season 17 (1998–99)

Season 18 (1999–2000)

Season 19 (2000–01)

Season 20 (2001–02)

Season 21 (2002–03)

Season 22 (2003–04)

Season 23 (2004–05)

Season 24 (2005–06)

Season 25 (2006–07)
As part of its 25th season, Frontline presented a four-part series titled News War.  Featuring 3 Frontline episodes and a fourth on its offshoot series Frontline World, News War explored the news media's reaction to the various internal and external forces (political, cultural, legal, economic) that changes and challenges its role in society.  News War was a co-production of Frontline and the UC Berkeley Graduate School of Journalism.

Season 26 (2007–08)

Season 27 (2008–09)

Season 28 (2009–2010)

Season 29 (2010–11)

Season 30 (2011–12)

Season 31 (2012–13)

Season 32 (2013–14)

Season 33 (2014–15)

Season 34 (2015–16)

Season 35 (2016–17)

Season 36 (2017–18)

Season 37 (2018–19)

Season 38 (2019–2020)

Season 39 (2020–21)

Season 40 (2021–22)

Season 41 (2022–23)

References

External links
PBS.org – Full chronological list

Lists of American non-fiction television series episodes
List